Veprecula pungens is a species of sea snail, a marine gastropod mollusk in the family Raphitomidae.

Description
The length of the shell attains 9 mm.

This species partakes of the general aspect of Veprecula arethusa but is distinguishable from it by its longer spire, narrower form, closer reticulation, and smooth apical whorls.

Distribution
This marine species was found off Hong Kong.

References

External links
 Dall W.H. (1918). Notes on the nomenclature of the mollusks of the family Turritidae. Proceedings of the United States National Museum. 54: 313-333

pungens
Gastropods described in 1860